The Albrunhorn (also known as Monte Figascian) is a mountain of the Lepontine Alps on the Swiss-Italian border. It overlooks the Albrun Pass.

References

External links
 Albrunhorn on Hikr

Mountains of the Alps
Mountains of Piedmont
Mountains of Valais
Italy–Switzerland border
International mountains of Europe
Lepontine Alps
Mountains of Switzerland
Two-thousanders of Switzerland